The 1974 FIVB Men's World Championship was the eighth edition of the tournament, organised by the world's governing body, the FIVB. It was held from 12 to 28 October 1974 in Mexico.

Qualification

* Hungary, Haiti and Argentina were replaced by France, Panama and Venezuela. Also Republic of China were replaced by People's Republic of China after FIVB recognised People's Republic of China as a legitimate Chinese state and Dominican Republic participated instead of North Korea who originally invited to the tournament.

Venues

Teams

Group A
 
 
 
 

Group B
 
 
 
 

Group C
 
 
 
 

Group D
 
 
 
 

Group E
 
 
 
 

Group F

Results

First round

Pool A
Location: Guadalajara

|}

|}

Pool B
Location: Mexico City

|}

|}

Pool C
Location: Monterrey

|}

|}

Pool D
Location: Tijuana

|}

|}

Pool E
Location: Puebla

|}

|}

Pool F
Location: Toluca

|}

|}

Second round

1st–12th pools

Pool G
Location: Mexico City

|}

|}

Pool H
Location: Puebla

|}

|}

Pool I
Location: Toluca

|}

|}

13th–24th pools

Pool J
Location: Guadalajara

|}

|}

Pool K
Location: Monterrey

|}

|}

Pool L
Location: Tijuana

|}

|}

Final round

19th–24th places
Location: Guadalajara

|}

|}

13th–18th places
Location: Tijuana

|}

|}

7th–12th places
Location: Toluca

|}

|}

Final places
Location: Mexico City

|}

|}

Final standing

External links
 Federation Internationale de Volleyball

FIVB Men's World Championship
V
V
FIVB Volleyball Men's World Championship
1974 in Mexican sports
October 1974 sports events in North America
October 1974 events in Mexico
1970s in Mexico City